Dutch Game Garden is an organization that promotes and improves the video game industry in the Netherlands. They do this by connecting entrepreneurs, financiers, knowledge centers, and governments. It was founded on June 19, 2008.

The Dutch Game Garden's main office in Utrecht is a business center for video game companies, providing office space for more than 72 game companies. The organization's Game Incubator Program organizes workshops, discussions, and interviews, covering subjects such as Marketing, Financing, Legal, and Team Management.

In 2010, the Dutch Game Garden introduced the INDIGO showcase, an interactive exhibition of Dutch video games. It has become an annual event in the Netherlands, and showcases Dutch video games at international events.

In 2011, the Dutch Game Garden received a 4-million-euro subsidy from the government and the European Union to realize its mission for another five years.

In 2013 and 2014, the Dutch Game Garden opened additional business center locations in Amsterdam and Hilversum (May, 19th). On March 3, 2015, Dutch Game Garden opened an additional business center location in Breda. Since late 2019, Dutch Game Garden has chosen to focus its full attention on the Utrecht location, closing all other locations.

Game Garden Agency
Game Garden Agency is a service offered by Dutch Game Garden since 2018. Its primary objective is to facilitate a matchmaking process for game studios seeking publishers and projects. Moreover, Game Garden Agency aims to encourage entrepreneurship among students and other aspiring individuals who aspire to work in the gaming industry. To achieve this, the service provides online business and video courses that offer insights into the workings of the games industry.

INDIGO
In 2010, Dutch Game Garden introduced the INDIGO showcase, an interactive exhibition of Dutch video games. INDIGO has now grown to an annual event that helps game developers get exposure and access to a network of international game industry experts. Since 2019 it has consisted of three tracks: xdiscover, xtalks, and xconnect. These are ,respectively, the game showcase, the presentations by industry experts, and the matchmaking service.

Games Monitor
Starting in 2012, Dutch Game Garden releases a research report every three years called Games Monitor. The Games Monitor looks into the trends and developments for applied and entertainment games in the Netherlands and includes an overview of the economic development of the Dutch games industry.

References

External links
 
 INDIGO page

Business incubators of the Netherlands
Video game companies of the Netherlands